Mohd Faisal bin Mohd Rosli (born 29 January 1991) is a Malaysian professional footballer who plays as a left back. Faisal was a product of Sri Pahang youth team. He got promoted to the senior team in at the end of 2012.

International career
On 2 June 2017, Faisal received his first call-up to the Malaysia national team to attend central training camp in Johor Bahru, on May 29, to prepare for the first Group B match of 2019 AFC Asian Cup qualification to meet Lebanon on 13 June 2017. However he did not play in the game and was on the bench.

Career statistics

Club

Honours
Sri Pahang
 Malaysia Cup: 2013, 2014
 Malaysia FA Cup: 2014, 2018 Runner-up: 2017
 Malaysia Super League runner-up: 2015, 2017, 2019

References

External links
 

1991 births
Living people
Malaysia international footballers
Malaysian footballers
Malaysian people of Malay descent
People from Pahang
Sri Pahang FC players
Kelantan United F.C. players
Association football defenders